The Sheriff of Nairn was historically the office responsible for enforcing law and order and bringing criminals to justice in Nairn, Scotland . In 1747 the office was merged with that of the Sheriff of Elgin to create the office of Sheriff of Elgin and Nairn.

Sheriffs of Nairn

William de Moravia (1204)
William Prat (1227)
Alexander Murray (1263-1267)
Reginald le Chen (1291)
Alexander Wiseman (1305)
Donald de Cawdor
William de Cawdor (1442)
William de Cawdor (1475)
Hugh de Cawdor
 For sheriffs after 1747 see sheriff of Elgin and Nairn.

See also
 Historical development of Scottish sheriffdoms

References

Sheriff courts
Highland (council area)